Sobyanin is a Russian masculine surname, its feminine counterpart is Sobyanina. Notable people with the surname include:

Sergey Sobyanin (born 1958), Russian statesman and politician
Vladimir Sobyanin (born 1952), Russian scientist

Russian-language surnames